Jabal Yār is a small basaltic volcanic field in Saudi Arabia, near the border with Yemen. It is the southernmost (young) volcanic field in Saudi Arabia. The field is rich in olivine.

Morphology
The field is located near the Red Sea, in the southwest of the country. The field contains three groups of volcanoes ('Ukwatain, Qummatain and Djar'attain-Harra). The area is still very active. South of Djar'attain and between it and 'Ukwatain, hot springs are present.

Eruptions
The only eruption at the field took place in 1810 CE ± 10 (give or take 10 years). It was a small (VEI 2) explosive eruption that produced lava flows.

See also
 List of volcanoes in Saudi Arabia
 Sarat Mountains
 'Asir Mountains

References

External links
 Photo of volcanic cone in Jabal Yar on Panaramio.com

Volcanoes of Saudi Arabia
Active volcanoes
'Asir Province